The 1995 Florida Gators baseball team represented the University of Florida in the sport of baseball during the 1995 college baseball season.  The Gators competed in Division I of the National Collegiate Athletic Association (NCAA) and the Eastern Division of the Southeastern Conference (SEC).  They played their home games at Alfred A. McKethan Stadium, on the university's Gainesville, Florida campus. The team was the first at Florida coached by Andy Lopez.

Roster

See also
Florida Gators
List of Florida Gators baseball players

References

External links
 Gator Baseball official website

Florida Gators baseball seasons
Florida Gators baseball team
Florida Gators